Ben Mowen (born 1 December 1984) is an Australian former professional rugby union player. He was the captain of the Australia national team and also the ACT Brumbies team in Super Rugby. He played at blindside flanker or number-eight.

Early life
Mowen was born in Brisbane and educated at Villanova College. He played for the Brisbane Easts club, and captained the Queensland under 19s.  At the 2005 Under 21 Rugby World Championship he captained Australia to finish second.

Rugby career
Mowen made his Super Rugby debut in 2006 Super 14 season for the Queensland Reds against the Sharks. He made only other six appearances for Reds during the season, all being in non-competition matches, so he moved to the Waratahs in 2007, joining Randwick in the Shute Shield competition.

Late in the 2011 Super Rugby season Mowen was forced to leave the Waratahs to allow for Rocky Elsom's return from the Brumbies. In July 2011 Mowen signed a two-year contract to play under Jake White at the Brumbies, being made captain for the 2012 season. In June 2013, former Wallaby, Stephen Larkham stated that, after some doubts, Mowen had turned out to be one of the best leaders he has ever encountered.

Mowen made his Wallaby debut on 22 June 2013, against the British and Irish Lions in the position of blindside flanker. He maintained his spot in the team for the entire series. On 31 October 2013, he replaced James Horwill as captain of the Wallabies.

Mowen left Australia at the end of the 2014 Super Rugby season. He has said of his departure from test rugby: "I am probably the first (Wallabies captain to be in this situation), but I'm also probably the first bloke to make his Test debut at 28 and retire at 29."

Reference list

External links
 
 Stats on It's Rugby

Australian rugby union players
Australia international rugby union players
Australian rugby union captains
ACT Brumbies players
Living people
New South Wales Waratahs players
People educated at Villanova College (Australia)
Queensland Reds players
Rugby union number eights
Rugby union players from Brisbane
1984 births
Montpellier Hérault Rugby players
Section Paloise players
Australian expatriate rugby union players
Australian expatriate sportspeople in France
Expatriate rugby union players in France